Maalaala Mo Kaya (formerly stylized as Maala-ala mo kaya...; abbreviated as MMK), also known as Memories, is a Philippine television drama anthology show broadcast by Kapamilya Channel under ABS-CBN Entertainment. Hosted by Charo Santos-Concio, it premiered on May 15, 1991. It has become the longest-running drama anthology in the Philippines, reaching its 31st year in 2022. The program features weekly real-life stories or anecdotes of common people or even famous celebrities and personalities through letter sending. The series has a counterpart radio program being broadcast on DZMM called "Maalaala Mo Kaya sa DZMM", a paperback ("pocketbooks") adaptation and a comic book adaptation under Mango Comics & Sterling. The program concluded on December 24, 2022 with the special named "MMK Tatlong Dekadang Pasasalamat: Grand Kumustahan".

Overview
From March 14, 2020, the production of the program's new episodes were suspended due to the COVID-19 pandemic in the Philippines, airing reruns of old episodes until May 2, 2020, due to the temporary closure of ABS-CBN because of the cease and desist order of the National Telecommunications Commission (NTC), following the expiration of the network's 25-year franchise granted in 1995.

The program is named after the eponymous song, "Maalaala Mo Kaya" by Constancio de Guzman. The song also serves as the program's opening theme, which was performed by Dulce. Beginning in the mid-2000s airings, the opening has been covered by Carol Banawa, and then by JM Yosures, replacing Banawa's version. Dulce's version is also used in the final episode in the closing credits.

A classics re-run version of the anthology series MMK Classics premiered on June 3, 2012, on The Filipino Channel. Because of the outreach abroad, the TFC series focused on fully translating every episode with English subtitles. The Philippine version entitled "MMK Klasiks" aired on ABS-CBN's Kapamilya Gold afternoon block as a temporary replacement program from December 17, 2012, to January 18, 2013, replacing Angelito: Ang Bagong Yugto before replaced into May Isang Pangarap. MMK Klasiks also airs on DZMM TeleRadyo as a fill-in to its radio counterpart, because the latter was pre-recorded, as well as on Jeepney TV dubbed as The Best of MMK.

On November 21, 2022, Santos-Concio announced that the show will air its three-part finale episode before the final episode on December 10, 2022. A special "MMK Tatlong Dekadang Pasasalamat: Grand Kumustahan" was then aired on December 24, 2022.

Episodes

Translations of the Filipino titles are in parentheses.

Notable episodes
"Rubber Shoes"
The first episode of MMK which aired on May 15, 1991 starring Robert Arevalo, Romnick Sarmenta and Vina Morales.
"Regalo" (Gift)
MMK episode topbilled by Vilma Santos, Ricky Davao and Maja Salvador and considered one of the most critically successful episodes.
"Lobo" (Balloon)
The highest-rated episode in Mega Manila (47.9% as per AGB Nielsen) that featured Regine Velasquez and Piolo Pascual. Regine also won her first acting award at the PMPC Star Awards for TV in 2002, because of this episode.
"Pier 39"
10th Anniversary Presentation. First Maalaala Mo Kaya episode filmed outside the Philippines starring Judy Ann Santos and Piolo Pascual. Shot in San Francisco, California, the episode tells about a caregiver who falls in love with a wayward man, despite being beholden to her elderly, wheelchair-using employer.

"Ferris Wheel"
A Christmas presentation of Maalaala mo Kaya which reunites ex-lovers Jericho Rosales and Kristine Hermosa.
"Unan" (Pillow)
The episode which tells the life story of Julie Vega, as portrayed by Angelica Panganiban. Michael de Mesa and Rio Locsin acted as Drs. Julio and Pearl Postigo, Julie Vega's parents. Aired in October 2003. The episode also marked the first time that highlights on the original live TV coverage of Julie Vega's 1985 funeral were released in unedited version by ABS-CBN since the network's rebirth in 1986.
"Fried Chicken"
The story about Maximo Gimenez (Albert Martinez), the founder of Max's Restaurant. After the Second World War, Max along with his niece Ruby, followed the suggestion of American troops to build a restaurant after they tasted the fried chicken that they served for them. This would start the beginning of Max's Restaurant that became a household name for generations.
"Pendant"
A Valentine's Day Special aired on February 14, 2009 and first episode for Toni Gonzaga with Jason Abalos and Ryan Eigenmann. This episode was about first love and how to let go and take the risk in order to be in love.
"Reseta" (Prescription)
A Mother's Day Special aired on May 9, 2009 starring Jodi Sta. Maria and Carmina Villaroel. This marked Villaroel's new appearance in a MMK episode on ABS-CBN after a few episodes she did in the 1990s before leaving the network.
"Sapatos" (Shoes)
A Mother's Day Special aired on May 15, 2016 starring Kris Aquino. This marked Aquino's new appearance in a MMK episode on ABS-CBN after a few episodes she did in the 1990s before leaving the network. The story was based on the real-life story of Honey Grace Villarico, how she fulfilled the role of a single mother facing all troubles alone and succeeded on being a career woman of her time.
"Blusa" (Blouse)
A controversial episode starring Angel Locsin and Dimples Romana that focuses on a story of a UP Los Baños summa cum laude graduate who found herself applying as a Guest Relations Officer (GRO), shown February 28, 2009. UPLB released a statement pointing out the credibility of the facts presented in the episode.  On March 10, 2009, ABS-CBN issued an apology for not verifying with UPLB the veracity of the facts. Meanwhile, Angel won as Outstanding Actress in a Drama Performance given by the Philippine Psychiatric Association SiSA Award.
"Ice Cream"
This is the life story of Jake Zyrus (Formerly Charice Pempengco), as portrayed by himself. This is Zyrus' first acting appearance with Zsa Zsa Padilla and Rhap Salazar played as the role of his mother and younger brother. The story features about him growing up in a middle-class family before his successful singing career. The episode aired in June 2008.
"Teddy Bear"
This is the story of comedian Pokwang, portrayed by herself.
"Kwintas" (Necklace)
This is the first episode of Sarah Geronimo and also marks the first on-screen tandem of her and John Lloyd Cruz.
"Gitara" (guitar)
This is the real-life story of Tara Santelices, who was comatose for a year after being shot to the head by a mugger on August 6, 2008. She was portrayed by Karylle.
"Upuan" (chair)
The episode of former senator Renato Cayetano, portrayed by Ronaldo Valdez about his battle with hepatitis and his son, Lino Cayetano's contribution to extend his life as portrayed by John Lloyd Cruz. This episode is also directed by Lino himself.
The Ninoy and Cory Aquino Story
On January 23 and 30, 2010, respectively, a two-part episode of the life story of former Senator Benigno Aquino Jr. and former President Corazon Aquino was aired for Cory's 77th Birthday. The first part was "Kalapati" which featured the humble beginnings of the said couple, from their marriage up to their political conflicts. The second part was "Makinilya" which depicted the latter days of Ninoy and the end of Martial Law. The series also featured real footage of the events that occurred during martial law and during Cory's success in the presidential race. Piolo Pascual portrayed the role of Benigno Aquino Jr. while Bea Alonzo played the role of Corazon Aquino.
"Tsinelas" (Slippers)
This is the story of 17-year-old Edgar and 11-year-old Dagul, two homeless brothers that suffer the severe trials of life with no food or money while travelling an, exhilarating journey from Manila to Samar for a better life. This is the posthumous work of actor AJ Perez, who died in a car crash on April 17, 2011.
In 2013, Another unrelated episode was also titled "Tsinelas", which is the TV adaptation of the story of the late Jesse Robredo, portrayed by Jericho Rosales.
"Krus" (Cross)
The Mother's Day Special of MMK for the year 2011 with Ai-Ai Delas Alas, John Arcilla, John Wayne Sace and Lester Liansang. A story about a struggling mother with her kids not blessed with perfect health.
"Kuweba" (Cave)
A special episode that features actors Robin Padilla and Vina Morales after nearly two decades since their last project together. This episode was aired on November 12, 2011 telling a story of a Muslim family struggling in a political and social turmoil.
"Singsing" (Ring)
The love story of Etrona and Panyong, who found happiness in each other's company until their last breath. This episode which was aired on November 19, 2011 is directed by Jeffrey Jeturian and stars Philippine veteran actors Eddie Garcia and Gloria Romero.<ref>{{cite web |url=http://www.pep.ph/guide/tv/9333/eddie-garcia-and-gloria-romero39s-characters-share-perpetual-love-in-maalaala-mo-kaya#39;s-characters-share-perpetual-love-in-Maalaala-Mo-Kaya<-em> |title=Eddie Garcia and Gloria Romero's characters share perpetual love in Maalaala Mo Kaya |publisher=Philippine Entertainment Portal |date=November 17, 2011}}</ref>
"Lente" (Lens)
The life story of an aspiring model Claudio C. Cañedo, portrayed by Mccoy De Leon, aired on August 9, 2012, this episode portrays how Claudio faces the challenges of a person exploring the world around him, meeting different persons from all walks of life and how he survived all the trials while trying to figure out what and who he really wants. Claudio has an identity crisis but then he realized that he is GAY by gender. Claudio had some same sex relationship in the past but when he met a guy from Laguna, he changed for good.
"T-shirt"
The story is about Gigi, a girl who got pregnant at a young age due to being raped repeatedly by her employer. Sharlene San Pedro, who played the role of Gigi was recognized internationally; she was nominated in the 17th Asian Television Awards for Best Actress in a Lead-Drama Role for her portrayal as a teenage mother in this episode aired on April 21, 2008.
"Manika" (Doll)
A 15-year-old girl named Nene, portrayed by Jane Oineza, who was recurrently raped by her stepfather. But her world drastically changed when her mother, portrayed by Angel Aquino, even assisted her live-in partner in the act of rape. Since then, Nene cursed the 'beauty' that she possesses. The episode was slated to air on June 2, 2012 but was pulled off after the MTRCB gave it an 'X' rating due to its sensitive theme. It was later re-edited and was given an 'SPG' rating to be aired on June 30, 2012. The episode went on to become one of Maalaala Mo Kayas most critically acclaimed presentations with viewers praising the acting performances of Jane Oineza and Angel Aquino and the risky move by ABS-CBN to air such episode. It is the show's all-time highest-rated episode nationwide (40% as per Kantar-TNS, and 27.1% in Metro Manila as per AGB Nielsen), and was its first ever airing nominated for Best Drama at the International Emmy Awards.
"Singsing" (Ring)
The life story of TESDA Director General Joel Villanueva portrayed by Diether Ocampo. He and his wife Gladys portrayed by Maricar Reyes had been married for seven years. But, Joel was confirmed to be impotent and could not conceive a child. But, through his deep faith, Joel and Gladys was given a child.
"Sanggol" (Baby)
The story of former MTRCB Chairman Grace Poe portrayed by Erich Gonzales. Coincidentally, Grace has also been elected senator in the 2013 elections.
"Lubid" (Rope)
 The story of Tourette syndrome victim Jerome Concepcion portrayed by Gerald Anderson which aired on November 7, 2009
"Flash Cards"
Fidel, a former teacher, portrayed by actor-singer Ariel Rivera survived from a heart attack. After a stressful activity despite the doctor telling him not to do, he suffers from a stroke which affects his comprehension and speech. Now his daughter, Jonah becomes his own teacher at home.
"Scrapbook"
The life story of Korean superstar Sandara Park
"Bintana" (Window)
The first episode of MMK to be aired in high definition on ABS-CBN HD on October 3, 2015 starring Tonton Gutierrez, Agot Isidro, Diego Loyzaga and Sofia Andres
"Pasa" (Bruise)
The episode aired on May 21, 2016 tells the life story of Rommel, portrayed by Raikko Mateo and Diego Loyzaga, who grew up in an unconventional family, with two mothers and a father, and saw it crumble due to his father's abusive behavior and vices, but he let the adversity in his life make him whole.
"Kweba"
Aired on June 18, 2016 starring Zanjoe Marudo as Mang Juan, a story of a loving father who will do everything to raise his children despite being illiterate. The airing became the show's second all-time highest-rated episode nationwide, garnering a massive 38.3% as per Kantar-TNS.
"Korona" (Crown)
Aired on June 3, 2017, it tells the line story of Pia Wurtzbach portrayed by Liza Soberano. Pia started working at the age of 12 when she joined showbiz. Afterwards, her dream of becoming a beauty queen become a reality. After 3 failed attempts, she finally got a chance and would become the third Filipina to be crowned Miss Universe 2015.
"Passport"
Aired on June 2, 2019, Nena, a teacher for 32 years, portrayed by Irma Adlawan who retire and put up her own business to spend more time with her family. She finds a high paying job as a caregiver in the U.S., hoping to regain everything she lost on an investment. But things do not go as planned as Nena learns that the person who recruits her is a human trafficker, portrayed by Agot Isidro and forces her to work as a house help for an abusive Filipino family.

Award-winning episodes
"Abo" (Ash)
Roderick Paulate was awarded by the first Asian Television Awards as Best Drama Performance By An Actor in 1996. He played the role of an indigenous Aeta, a victim of the eruption of Mount Pinatubo.
"Wristwatch"
Roderick Paulate was awarded again by the fifth Asian Television Awards as Best Drama Performance By An Actor in 2000.
"Song Book"
Aiza Seguerra was awarded by the seventh Asian Television Awards as Best Drama Performance By An Actress in 2002.
"Rehas" (Jail Bars)
Gina Pareño was awarded Best Drama Performance By An Actress by 12th Asian Television Awards in 2007.
"Pilat" (Scar)
For this episode, Angel Locsin won her first acting award for Best Single Performance By An Actress in the 22nd PMPC Star Awards for TV.
"Lobo" (Balloon)
The episode stars Regine Velasquez and Piolo Pascual. Regine won Best Single Performance By An Actress for this episode at the 16th PMPC Star Award for Television The TV Series also serves as a memorable performance for Regine Velasquez as her first MMK episode.
"Skating Rink"
John Lloyd Cruz won Outstanding Lead Actor In A Drama Special at the 2nd Enpress Golden Screen Entertainment TV Awards in 2005. He played the role of Jonel, a guy with cerebral palsy, but had a hidden talent in ice skating.
"Sako" (Sack)
This episode starring Jay Manalo and Joshua Dionisio, won in the 17th KBP Golden Dove Awards. It tells the story of an abusive father who keeps his children working while he spends all their hard-earned money.
"Regalo" (Gift)
Starring Vilma Santos with Maja Salvador. This episode won the Best TV Drama Program at the 15th KBP Golden Dove Awards while actress Vilma won Best Single Performance By An Actress at the 20th PMPC Star Awards for TV in 2006.
"Lupa" (Soil)
Starring Ketchup Eusebio, Gina Pareño, Nikka Valencia and Jan Marini, the episode was nominated as Best Drama Series in the 4th Seoul International Drama Awards in 2009. The story is about a boy that returns to a poor neighborhood in Bicol in order to make his sick mother's wish come true.
"Basket"
Starring Judy Ann Santos, Caridad Sanchez, Kier Legaspi and Nikka Valencia, this episode won the 2001 Catholic Mass Media Awards for Best Drama and the 2001 KBP Golden Dove Awards Best Drama Program. It also became finalist at the Magnolia Award for Best Film for TV during the 9th Shanghai Television Festival 2002 in China.
"Kotse-kotsehan"/"Litrato"
A two-part special episodes (Picture and Kotse-kotsehan) starring Angel Locsin and Dimples Romana. Angel won 5 Best Actress Awards from 1st Gawad Lasallianeta, 7th Edukcircle Awards, 2nd GEMS Awards , 26th KBP Golden Dove Awards and 16th Gawad Tanglaw. MMK won Best Single Drama/Telemovie at the inaugural Asian Academy Creative Awards in Singapore. The show's winning entry is “Kotse-kotsehan” (with international title “Toy Car”), a special two-part episode of “MMK” which depicted the two perspectives of a mother's love for her children, and topbilled by award-winning actresses Angel Locsin and Dimples Romana. Litrato was about Idai's (Dimples Romana)' quest to find her lost son, while Kotse-kotsehan is about Samina's (Angel Locsin) point of view of the story, in which she found Idai's son and raised him. She was caught with her younger sister Aisah and charged with kidnapping.

Best of MMK
As listed on the official website of the show:"Rubber Shoes"Romnick Sarmienta
In this very first episode of Maalaala Mo Kaya aired on May 15, 1991, Romnick Sarmienta plays Allan, a social climber who is ashamed of his impoverished state and pretends to be well-off to blend in with his rich friends in school. His father, a street sweeper, works very hard to meet his luxurious needs. Only when it is too late does Allan realize that money does not necessarily make a man happy."Sako" (Sack)
Jay Manalo
Miong (Jay Manalo) and his entire family work as tenants for a sugarcane plantation in Negros Occidental. The eldest child, Giling (Joshua Dionisio) is forced by his father to give up schooling to help in the farm. Giling suffers maltreatment not only from the abusive people in the plantation but from his own father, who is so consumed by his obsession for money and power. When their family is struck by a tragedy, Giling vows to rise above the oppression."Regalo" (Gift)
Vilma Santos
Daisy Hernandez (Vilma Santos), a mother, must divide her time between work and taking care of her daughter April (Maja Salvador), who has cerebral palsy. Daisy's heart is wrenched every time she sees her eldest child suffer because of her illness. But Daisy never loses hope, and April manages to live a normal life until she is 18. Just when Daisy thought things are doing fine with her daughter's disability, a tragedy will further test her faith."Pier 39" (MMKs first out of the country episode aired on July 26, 2001)
Judy Ann Santos, Piolo Pascual
When Miguel (Piolo Pascual) gets petitioned by his father to the States, he thought that his dad intended to make up for all the lost time between them. However, he is treated so badly that he would rather be homeless than live with him and his nasty second wife. Miguel would have starved to death if not for Arlene (Judy Ann Santos) who helps him pick up the pieces of his life. Together they are able to conquer their fears and create something beautiful out of their miserable past.

"Baul" (Chest)
Charo Santos, Coney Reyes, Ricky Belmonte, Nikka Valencia
Years after a heart-wrenching incident, Minda (Charo Santos-Concio) returned to her hometown to make Letty (Connie Reyes) pay for stealing her fiancé (Ricky Belmonte) away from her. But it was not sweet revenge because their friendship mattered more than the man who came between them. Would Letty and Minda truly open their hearts and let the healing begin?

"Unan" (Pillow) (portrayal of Julie Vega's lifestory)
Angelica Panganiban
Ever since she was young, people already noticed her talent. Little Darling as her family called her, Julie Pearl Postigo, better known as Julie Vega, began her show business career at the age seven. She was discovered by a talent coordinator and offered her a commercial stint. She personally felt the love of working for television. As a young child, she would pray that she get the roles she auditions for. Her first film project was Ang Mga Mata ni Angelita. From then on, her popularity was irrepressible. She was dubbed as "the grown up little girl" due her mature drama roles at a young age. The most tragic part of her life was the death of her brother. Julie deeply mourned. One day, she felt weak and weaker as the days passed. At the height of her career in 1985, Julie died on the 6 May. Until now, her family never revealed her illness.

"Sing-along Bar" (portrayal of Ai Ai delas Alas's lifestory)
Maricel Soriano
When Ai-Ai (played by Maricel Soriano) was young, she was given away by her biological mom to her aunt. As she was growing up, she considered herself unlucky for always getting caught in a series of unfortunate events. She cannot also find a decent job to help her earn a living. Until one day, she was offered a job in a comedy bar. A famous person discovered her talents and offered her to sing in a concert. This paved her way to TV shows and movies where she started very low. Later on, she will meet a man that she will marry and from then on, she considers her life a roller coaster. Amidst all the challenges she is facing, she made her way on top of her dreams.

"Sa Kandungan mo, Inay" (My Mother's Lap)
Anita Linda
Sisters Millet (Janice De Belen), and Cielo (Charo Santos-Concio) despised their mother (Anita Linda) because of her cruelty towards them. Millet especially envied her sister Leslie (Dina Bonnevie), because she was their mom's favorite and received special treatment.

"Retaso" (Remnant)
Nora Aunor
Since the beginning of her relationship with Dado (Joel Torre), a widower, Anita (Nora Aunor) knew that she will become a step-mother to his three children. It was hard for Anita to win the love of the children but later they felt Anita's genuine concern and eventually opened up to her. But just when things were slowly falling into place she discovers that Dado has been cheating on her. Will she be able to turn her back on the children, whose lives now depended on her?

"Burda" (Pillowcase)
Sharon Cuneta
Lita (Sharon Cuneta) has been taking care of Stephen (Patrick Garcia) since he was a baby because his parents are always busy with work and going out of the country. Even though she is just his yaya, Lita looked after Stephen like a real mother. Stephen eventually reaches his teens and Lita is often caught in between her ward and his parents' differences. An incident makes Lita realize her limitations as yaya and instills in her the hard lesson of letting go.

"Lapida" (Gravestone)
Kris Aquino, Phillip Salvador
Jan (Phillip Salvador), a single parent, earns a living as a fireman. During a mission, he is able to save the lives of Annie (Kris Aquino) and her son after her husband Tony set their house on fire who is then killed by an exploding bulb. But unknown to him, his own son sneakily follows him inside the burning house to help him after he gets passed through the firemen and dies. Annie in return helps him with his grief and they become close friends. As their friendship blossom into love, will Annie and Jan be able to reconcile their differences and make their relationship work?

"Bisikleta" (Bicycle)
Dolphy
When Abel (Dolphy) caught his wife cheating on him with his best friend Carding, he angrily drove them away and was left with a son to care for. He would have made amends with Liza for their son's sake but an unfortunate circumstance got him imprisoned for 40 years. As soon as he got out, however, he sought his family again to prove his innocence to his son whom he lived for all this time.

Specials
15th Anniversary Celebration
In 2006, MMK marked their 15th anniversary on television by presenting a two-part special episode that stars Vilma Santos, Ricky Davao and Maja Salvador entitled “Regalo” (Gift). The story was about Daisy Hernandez, a mother who devote most of her time to her daughter.

16th Anniversary Celebration
In 2007, MMK presented an episode of their 16th anniversary entitled “Rehas” (Jail) where actress Gina Pareño played the story of a mother who struggles to take care of her three mentally ill children in Aklan. Her acting won her Best Drama Performance By An Actress at the 12th Asian Television Awards while director Jerry Lopez Sineneng won the Best Direction in 2008. Also for this episode, MMK won the Special Award in Drama at the 2008 Seoul International Drama Awards.

18th Anniversary Celebration
In 2009, MMK celebrated their 18th anniversary by presenting five special episodes and four of which were filmed in the United States, in association with The Filipino Channel.

"Pansit" (August 1, 2009)
Erich Gonzales, Ai-Ai de las Alas
A story about an 18-year-old debutant who struggles to cope in adolescence due to money problems, including her own debut.
"Cap" (August 8, 2009)
Noel Trinidad, Nanding Josef, Joji Isla, Lucita Soriano, Louella Albornoz and Prospero Luna
A story of Filipino World War II veterans living in San Francisco, California and their fight for equal benefits from the United States.
"Apron" (August 15, 2009)
G. Toengi, Ryan Eigenmann
A story of a couple having a life in America and the struggles they face while living their American Dream.
"Letters" (August 22, 2009)
Princess Punzalan, Michael de Mesa
A story of a woman struggling in her own divorce and finding love again.
"Car" (August 29, 2009)
Gina Alajar, Lauren Young, Ilonah Jean and Anne Walters
A story of a friendship between a Filipino caregiver and a patient with Parkinson's disease.

20th Anniversary – Dalawang Dekada

Documentary
On September 25, 2011, Sunday's Best, Maalaala Mo Kaya aired its 20th anniversary documentary special called MMK 20: Maalaala Mo Kaya Dalawang Dekada on ABS-CBN. During the documentary special, it features different segments including the highlights of the best episodes in the series, commentaries from the artists, director and producers who contributed to the program and featured stories relayed in the program for 20 years. Segment hosts are Sarah Geronimo for dramatic episodes, Angelica Panganiban for romance and comedy episodes, Vhong Navarro for MMKs episode titles, KC Concepcion for celebrity portrayals, Piolo Pascual for love stories by the period of time, and Sam Milby for out of the country episodes. The last part of the special is an interview with Vilma Santos with the program's main host Charo Santos.

Celebration
Similar to its 18th anniversary celebration, the show's 20th anniversary would be celebrated month-long with five special episodes. The episodes were taped in varying locations in the Philippines and abroad including Bukidnon, Palawan, Japan, and Barcelona, Spain.

"Tungkod" (October 1, 2011) (Palawan)
Angel Aquino, Yul Servo
The episode will feature Angel Aquino who will play the role of a mother who fought her way to stop mining in Palawan, but undergone series of devastating events like blindness and broken family. This episode is directed by 62nd Cannes Film Festival best director Brillante Mendoza.

"Tap Dancing Shoes" (The Happy Feet Story) (October 8, 2011) (Bukidnon)
John Prats, Nash Aguas, Ariel Rivera
The episode will features the life story of Ramon and Bambi, the tap-dancing brothers or also known in the Philippines as Happy Feet from Bukidnon, a runner-up at Pilipinas Got Talent Season 2 played by John Pratts & Nash Aguas. The episode is directed by Dado Lumibao.

"Susi" (October 15, 2011) (Barcelona)
Jake Cuenca, Ricky Davao
The episode will feature the story of Louie, a cross-dresser who lives in Barcelona, Spain and his story on how he live his alternative life only trying to please his father in order to accept him portrayed by Jake Cuenca. The episode is directed by Dado Lumibao.

"Liham" (October 22, 2011) (Aurora)
KC Concepcion, Dina Bonnevie, Paulo Avelino
A special episode aired on October 22, 2011 that features a life story of a woman named Aurora who empowered herself by making her dreams happen. This episode is directed by Jerry Lopez Sineneng. It was the first mother role for actress KC Concepcion and Paulo Avelino's first acting project as a Kapamilya.

"Passbook" (October 29, 2011) (Japan)
Rio Locsin, Desiree del Valle, Ya Chang
A special episode aired on October 29, 2011 about the story of Anita, single parent of five children working and struggling in Japan who had a second chance on her love life. The episode is directed by Nuel C. Naval.

Films
Maalaala Mo Kaya: The Movie (1994)
As part of the third anniversary of the program, a film version was created produced by Star Cinema and directed by Olivia Lamasan released on June 22, 1994.  The plot of the film revolves around the story of Ana, a young girl who took the responsibility of being the mother of her cousin Marissa's son while the latter spent her life in Japan as an entertainer. It stars Aiko Melendez, Richard Gomez and Chin-Chin Gutierrez. Also the film compete as one of the entries for the 1994 Metro Manila Film Festival and awarded Melendez as the Best Actress.

Planned Maalaala Mo Kaya (20th Anniversary) movie
In 2011, it was announced that the program would do another film version for its 20th anniversary. The film would have starred Bea Alonzo, Zanjoe Marudo and Angel Locsin to be directed by Laurenti M. Dyogi under Star Cinema. However, for unknown reasons, the movie was permanently shelved.

Radio drama
In March 2007, MMK started its radio counterpart "Maalaala Mo Kaya sa DZMM" as a daily radio drama being broadcast on DZMM. It is also hosted by Charo Santos-Concio and airs weekdays from 12:30 to 1:00 PM. It was recently recognized as the Best Drama Program at the 32nd Catholic Mass Media Awards. Other awards including Best Radio Drama Program at the 18th KBP Golden Dove Awards 2009, Best Drama Program at the 31st Catholic Mass Media Awards (CMMA) 2009, Best Drama at the 29th Catholic Mass Media Awards (CMMA) 2007 and Best Drama Program at the 16th KBP Golden Dove Awards 2007.

The radio program itself previously aired on DZMM TeleRadyo, but since it was already pre-recorded, the DZMM station ID was shown instead of a shot of the booth during its air time. Eventually, it was replaced by MMK Klasiks and is only aired on DZMM TeleRadyo. In 2016, MMK Klasiks moved to 1:00pm because of the new program Headline Pilipinas, in honor of DZMM's 30th anniversary. The next year, MMK sa DZMM moved to a later timeslot to make way of the said news program to be heard on radio. Since June 19, 2017 MMK sa DZMM airs every weekdays from 2:00pm to 2:30pm only on DZMM Radyo Patrol 630 and MMK Klasiks'' airs at 9:30pm to 10:00pm only on DZMM TeleRadyo.

Literary adaptations

Maalaala Mo Kaya Komiks
The drama anthology also created a comic book adaptation under Bituin Komiks owned by Mango Comics and Sterling with its initial issue on March 27, 2008. The first comic series was about the life story of Philippine comedian Chokoleit with art direction of Arnel Avetria, adapted by Jonas Diego from a teleplay by Maribel G. Ilag, illustrated by Mannie Abeleda and Jim Faustino, tones and letters by Sandy Gonzaga and edited by Lawrence Mijares.

Maalaala Mo Kaya Romance Paperback
The drama anthology also has a paperback (pocketbooks) novels under ABS-CBN Publishing. Although the novels only features romantic stories.

References

Notes

External links

 
1991 Philippine television series debuts
2022 Philippine television series endings
ABS-CBN drama series
Cultural depictions of Filipino people
Filipino-language television shows
Philippine anthology television series
Television productions suspended due to the COVID-19 pandemic